Marc Liénart van Lidth de Jeude (22 November 1950 – 27 December 2019), known professionally as Art Sullivan, was a Belgian singer. He was successful in many countries, including Belgium, France, Portugal and Germany.  Art Sullivan sold ten million records between 1972 and 1978. Compilations of his hits are still released.

He died from pancreatic cancer on 27 December 2019.

Noble House Van Lidth de Jeude
The family members of the Noble House of Van Lidth de Jeude are living in Belgium and the Netherlands. The parents of Art Sullivan are Marie-José d'Udekem d'Acoz and Josse Liénart van Lidth de Jeude. His mother, daughter of Baron Guy d'Udekem is a distant relative of Queen Mathilde of Belgium; they have little contact.

Discography 
Singles released in France/Belgium include:
 "Ensemble" (Termol – Art Sullivan) (1972)
 "Revoir" (Velt – Art Sullivan) (1972)
 "Adieu, sois heureuse" (Termol / Art Sullivan) (1972)
 "Petite fille aux yeux bleus" (Jacques Velt / Art Sullivan) (1973)
 "Une larme d'amour" (Jacques Velt / Art Sullivan) (1973)
 "Donne, donne moi" (Jacques Velt / Art Sullivan / arrgts. Gabriel Yared) (1974)
 "Muy Juntos" (1974)
 "Un océan de caresses" (Sirna Velt – Art Sullivan / Claude Carrère – Jean Schmitt) (1975)
 "Viens près de moi" (Velt – Art Sullivan) (1975)
 "Petite demoiselle" (Art Sullivan – Jacques Velt – Ch. Dumolin) (1975)
 "Jenny (Lady)" (Dumoulin – Velt / Velt – Art Sullivan) (1975)
 "Vivre d'amour, besoin d'amour" (1976)
 "Sur le bord d'une vie" (Art Sullivan – J. Velt) (1976)
 "Et si tu pars" [Art Sullivan et Kiki] (1977)
 "C'est la vie, c'est jolie (1977)
 "Leana" (1977)
 "Monsieur tu, madame vous" (1977)
 "Fan fan fan" [Art Sullivan and the Cash Band] (Art Sullivan – J. Velt – R. Lienart – M. Wittmann) (1978)
 "Qu'il me revienne"  (Termol) (1978)
 "Dame, dame, damélo" (1978)
 "Tu Minha Mãe" (1978)
 "L'amour á la française" [Art Sullivan & Kiki] (1979)
 "Tu le sais" (1979)
 "Douce comme l'amour" (Gabriel Yared – J. Velt – Art Sullivan) (1979)
 "L'amour á la française" [Art Sullivan & Fernanda de Sousa] (1979)
 "T'en aller" (1981)
 "Les temps qui passe" (J. Velt – Art Sullivan – J. Mercier) (1985)
 "Si tu veux" (J. Velt – Art Sullivan – Ch. Demolin) (1987)
 "Parle moi de toi" (1987)
 "Ode à Mathilde" (2000)
 "Pré-verre" (2002)
 "Determination"
 "Monsieur Chopin"
 "Appelle-la"

References

External links

Most of the information comes from: 
  Official website

1950 births
2019 deaths
20th-century Belgian male singers
20th-century Belgian singers
Belgian LGBT singers
French-language singers of Belgium
Belgian pop singers
Belgian nobility
Deaths from pancreatic cancer
Deaths from cancer in Belgium
21st-century Belgian LGBT people